Phil of the Future is an American science-fiction comedy television series that originally aired on Disney Channel from June 18, 2004, to August 19, 2006, for two seasons. The series was created by Douglas Tuber and Tim Maile and produced by 2121 Productions. It follows a family from the future that gets stranded in the 21st century when their time machine breaks down.

Episodes

Characters

Main
Philip "Phil" Rupert Diffy (Ricky Ullman) – Phil Diffy (born 2107) is the main character in the series. He is a freshman in season 1 and sophomore in season 2, at H.G. Wells Junior/Senior High School. He seems to be the most "in tune" with how things work in this century. Phil frequently has to make up excuses to hide the fact that he is from the future. He is the best friend and later boyfriend of Keely Teslow. Phil is two years older than Pim.
Pimilla "Pim" Nicole Diffy (Amy Bruckner) – Pim Diffy (born 2109) is Phil's younger sister by two years. She is a 7th (season 1) / 8th (season 2) grader at H.G. Wells Junior/Senior High. Pim is a mischievous girl who is constantly up to no good and is even prone to megalomania. Pim is especially known for liking to pull pranks on people, mainly on Phil, Debbie Berwick, and Vice Principal Hackett. In the second season, she hangs out with a young boy named "Li'l Danny" Dawkins. She also tries to avoid Debbie Berwick and Candida. Repeatedly in the show, she looks for ways to dominate the world and universe. Though Pim often causes trouble for Phil and has a tough attitude, she cares about her brother, but keeps it hidden most of the time.
Keely Teslow (Alyson Michalka) – Keely Teslow (born March 1990) is Phil's best friend and later girlfriend. She is the only person who knows Phil and his family are from the future. Keely is an energetic and bubbly girl who aspires to be a news reporter. She starts to harbor romantic feelings for Phil during season 2. She sometimes uses Phil's gadgets as a shortcut for schoolwork. She is notable on the show for her numerous hairstyles and colorful clothes. In the later episodes of the series, she hosts her own daily news program on the school's closed-circuit television broadcasting system. In the episode "The Giggle," she gets to look ahead at her own future and learns that she does, in fact, become a successful news reporter. It is also noted that she is wearing a wedding ring, but turns down the chance to see who her husband is. In the final episode, Phil and Keely finally reveal their feelings for each other and start dating after being voted "Cutest Couple" by their school. However, shortly after they begin dating, Pim helps Lloyd finally repair the time machine. Keely asks Phil to wait for her in the future, which he agrees to. However, given that Keely had likely been long dead before Phil's birth, it was implied that Phil's parents elected to return to the 21st Century to permanently settle there and have Phil resume a conventional relationship with Keely.
Lloyd Diffy (Craig Anton) – Lloyd Diffy (born 2074) is Phil and Pim's goofy dad, who is working on repairing the time machine. He was an engineer in 2121, and loves "older music." He is paranoid about the government (and Vice Principal Hackett) figuring out that his family and he are from the future. During the Diffys' stay, Lloyd and Curtis get jobs at the Mantis hardware store. Lloyd is two years older than Barb.
Barbara "Barb" Diffy (Lise Simms) – Barbara Diffy (née Speckle; born 2076) is Phil and Pim's mom. She is very interested in how things work in this century. Unlike other mothers, though, Barbara seems to let her kids figure things out on their own. She loves to cook the old fashioned way; however, her food usually ends up with something being wrong, because in 2121 they spray food out of a can. Promotional material described her as having an artificial body, but this was never seen in the series. She forces Pim to be friends with Debbie, though Pim hates Debbie. Her maiden name is revealed in the episode "Not So Great-Great-Grandpa."

Recurring
Curtis (J. P. Manoux) – Curtis (born around 30,000 BC) is a caveman (Cro-Magnon, as mentioned in the episode "Dinner Time") who stowed away in the Diffys' time machine when they went back to visit the Stone Age. The Diffys struggle to make Curtis seem like a normal person, and often pretend he is Phil's uncle. Throughout the series, he learns more English.
Vice Principal Neil Hackett (J.P. Manoux) – Vice Principal Hackett (born 1969) is the Vice Principal at Phil, Keely, and Pim's school, H.G. Wells Junior/Senior High School. In the school, he is also Phil's teacher in science and Pim's teacher in history. He is often found snooping around the Diffys' house as he tries to figure out where they are really from, though he believes they are aliens. He is the main antagonist of the series. Other than Keely, he is the only person to find out that Phil and his family are from the future. This is short lived however as The Diffys travel back in time before they ever told him.
Ms. Guinevere Winston (Suzanne Krull) – A second-grade teacher in season 1 (whose writing class Phil had to attend in the episode "Tanner"), and Pim's teacher in season 2.

Season 1
Bradley Benjamin Farmer (Rory Thost) – Pim's rival in season 1. He is made fun of his short height (constantly being called a munchkin by Pim). He dated Debbie but Pim broke them up and he became infatuated with Pim.
Deborah Hortence "Debbie" Berwick (Kay Panabaker) – Debbie (born 1990) is the complete opposite of Pim and she has a very happy attitude towards life. She hardly ever gets mad and is very nice. Debbie also considers Pim to be her best friend. Because of this, Pim likes to take advantage of Debbie's good-natured personality. She lives with her grandma and teaches a yoga class. Her other friends are Neckbrace Lana and Silent Judy. Debbie used to date Bradley until Pim broke them up by changing Debbie's personality but Debbie went back to normal. Debbie enjoys singing and is in the school band. She was written out of the show after season 1. It was revealed in the Halloween special that she was a "happy" cyborg made by a cyborg-making company. She was intended to only do good and be always happy, until finally having a malfunction and turning evil and attempting to "nicely" enslave the world (starting from her schoolmates) into baking cupcakes for charity. At the episode's conclusion, Phil was forced to melt her.
Neckbrace Lana (Carlie Westerman) – Lana is a girl who did the school news and was in Pim's grade. She and Pim hated each other. She always wears a neckbrace, as she had pinched a nerve at some time in the past.
Seth Wosmer (Evan Peters) – Seth is the nerdy friend of Phil, Keely, and Tia. He is a member of the H.G. Wells billiards team, and the first student at the school to befriend Phil.  His role was replaced by the more suave Owen in season 2.
Tanner Kirkpatrick (Chris Hunter) – A crush of Keely's in the episode "Your Cheatin' Heart" and was in the show most of the season. Phil seems to dislike him and sometimes cracks jokes about him and vice-versa, especially after Phil caught him cheating on Keely.
Tia Deanna Fedichelli (Brenda Song) – Keely's best friend. She is popular and friendly. She also seems to be rich. Though she can be spoiled and snobby sometimes, she is friendly and described as the girl next door by Phil; replaced by Via in season 2, due to Brenda Song leaving the show to star in The Suite Life of Zack & Cody.

Season 2
Candida (Spencer Locke) – The "mean" girl that excludes Pim and insults her by frequently referring to her as "Pim-ple." She is referred to as one of the "fashion zombies" by Pim.
"Lil Danny" Dawkins (Brandon Smith) – He has a crush on Pim and always gets involved with her antics. Pim does not seem to show affection for him, with the exception of when they danced at the dance in the episode "Get Ready To Go-Go."
Joel Messerschmitt (Joel Brooks) – Phil and Kepleasure will fa He has a sister named Bettina (also played by Brooks) and a nephew, Nathan (Josh Flitter), who both shockingly carry the same family trait of having a mustache. He reveals in the episode "The Gile" that his parents were acrobats.
Olivia ("Via") (Juliet Holl-Rose) – Via is a girl from England who transferred because her father is in the military. She became friends with Keely after Tia moved. In the episode "Get Ready To Go-Go," Phil went to a Sadie Hawkins dance with her, after a near-miss in returning to the future ruined his plans to go with Keely.
Owen (Michael Mitchell) – Phil's friend who replaced Seth. He is not that smart and is laid-back, also constantly trying to hit on girls (though he never succeeds).

Production 
Phil of the Futures working title was The Out of Timers. The theme song for Phil of the Future was written by John Adair and Steve Hampton. It was sung by Loren Ellis and the Drew Davis Band, who also sang the theme song of The Suite Life of Zack & Cody.

Awards and nominations
Directors Guild of America
2007 - Outstanding Directorial Achievement in Children's Programs - Fred Savage for episode "Not So Great Great Great Grandpa" (Nominated)
Writers Guild of America
2007 - Children's Episodic & Specials - David Steven Cohen for episode "Broadcast Blues" (Nominated)
Young Artist Awards
2006 - Best Performance in a TV Series (Comedy or Drama): Leading Young Actress - Amy Bruckner (Nominated)
2005 - Best Performance in a TV Series (Comedy or Drama): Leading Young Actress - Alyson Michalka (Nominated)
2005 - Best Performance in a Television Series: Recurring Young Actor - Rory Thost (Nominated)
2005 - Best Performance in a Television Series: Recurring Young Actress - Kay Panabaker (Nominated)

Related media 
A DVD of the show titled Gadgets & Gizmos was released on August 16, 2005. It contains four episodes, including a then-unaired episode. The episode "Christmas Break" was released as a bonus feature on the Disney Channel Holiday DVD compilation, released November 1, 2005.

A video game based on Phil of the Future was released for the Game Boy Advance on August 22, 2006. In the game, Pim uses a cloning machine to create clones of a pet from the future called "Blahs" and it is up to Phil to stop them.

Book List 
Disney Publishing released a variety of Phil of the Future-related books throughout the 2000's, including:

Home media
The series became available to stream on Disney+ in the U.S. when it launched on November 12, 2019.

References

External links 

 
 

2000s American single-camera sitcoms
2000s American teen sitcoms
2000s American comic science fiction television series
2003 American television series debuts
2006 American television series endings
ABC Kids (TV programming block)
American time travel television series
English-language television shows
Disney Channel original programming
Television series by Disney
Television shows set in Los Angeles
Television series by It's a Laugh Productions
Television series about families
Television series about siblings
Television series about teenagers
Television series set in the 22nd century
Television shows adapted into video games
2000s American time travel television series